Robert Reynolds (born May 20, 1981) is a former American football linebacker of the National Football League. He was drafted by the Tennessee Titans in the fifth round of the 2004 NFL Draft. He played college football at Ohio State.

College football
Reynolds is known for an incident in college referred to as the Reynolds–Sorgi incident, where Reynolds intentionally choked Wisconsin Badgers quarterback Jim Sorgi, injuring Sorgi's trachea, after the play had been whistled dead.

On October 28, 2011, Reynolds made a public apology for the incident, citing his wife and four children as the reason he wanted to clear his reputation and be accountable for his actions. Reynolds also stated that he and Sorgi had made amends years prior to the interview.

Professional career

Tennessee Titans
Reynolds was drafted by the Tennessee Titans in the fifth round (165th overall) of the 2004 NFL Draft. He appeared in 14 games his rookie season including one start, recording 13 tackles.

In 2005, Reynolds appeared in all but one game for the Titans including one start and recorded a career-high 23 tackles (14 solo). In a Week 2 game against the Baltimore Ravens, Reynolds blocked a Dave Zastudil punt in the fourth quarter. The ball was recovered by Ravens safety Will Demps, who was tackled by Reynolds in the end zone for a safety.

Reynolds appeared in just four games in 2006, recording five tackles. He was placed on season-ending injured reserve on November 10 with a quadriceps injury.

A restricted free agent in the 2007 offseason, Reynolds was tendered a contract by the Titans on March 1. He signed the one-year tender offer on April 6, but was placed on injured reserve by the team on July 18.

Personal
Reynolds and his older brother, Patrick, are also believed to be the only siblings to win national championships at the BCS level (Robert) and at the I-AA level (Patrick, senior lineman for Western Kentucky's National Championship team). Both won in the 2002 Season.

References

1981 births
Living people
American football linebackers
Ohio State Buckeyes football players
Tennessee Titans players
Sportspeople from Bowling Green, Kentucky
Players of American football from Kentucky